William Honywood  may refer to:
 Sir William Honywood, 2nd Baronet (c.1654–1748), MP for Canterbury
William Philip Honywood (1790–1831), MP for Kent
William Honywood (died 1818) (c.1759–1818), MP for Kent
Sir William Wynne Honywood, 10th Baronet, of the Honywood baronets

See also
Honywood